The Fly River is the third longest river in the island of New Guinea, after the Sepik River and Mamberamo River, with a total length of . It is the largest by volume of discharge in Oceania, the largest in the world without a single dam in its catchment, and overall the 20th-largest primary river in the world by discharge volume. It is located in the southwest of  Papua New Guinea and in the Papua Province of Indonesia. It rises in the Victor Emanuel Range arm of the Star Mountains, and crosses the south-western lowlands before flowing into the Gulf of Papua in a large delta. The  Strickland River is the longest and largest tributary of Fly River, making it the farthest distance source of the Fly River.

Description

The Fly flows mostly through the Western Province of Papua New Guinea and for a small stretch, it forms the international boundary with western New Guinea.  This section protrudes slightly to the west of the 141°E longitude line. To compensate for this slight gain in territory for Papua New Guinea, the border south of the Fly River is slightly east of the 141°E longitude line.  As part of this deal, Indonesia has the right to use the Fly River to its mouth for navigation.

The principal tributaries of the Fly are the Strickland and the Ok Tedi.

Close to its mouth, the flow of the Fly River encounters a tidal bore, where an incoming high tide pushes water upstream until the tide changes. The range of this tidal bore is still undocumented.

Discharge

Average, minimum and maximum discharge of the Fly River at Ogwa (Lower Fly). Period from 1998 to 2022.

Delta 

The delta of the Fly River is over 100 km wide at its entrance, but only 11 km wide at the apex upstream of Kiwai Island. The delta contains 3 main distributary channels (the Southern, Northern, and Far Northern Entrances) that branch from a common point (the “apex”). The distributary channels are 5 to 15m in depth, separated by elongate, sand-mud islands that are stabilised by lush mangrove vegetation. The islands are eroded and rebuilt rapidly in the apex area, where they have lateral migration rates of up to 150 m/a, with slower rates for the more seaward islands.  Upstream from the apex the river gradually narrows to a width of 1.6 km or less.  The Fly Delta exhibits a distinctive funnel shape in plan view, attesting to the fundamental role of tidal currents in shaping the Delta's geomorphology.  Mean spring tidal ranges are amplified within the delta, from around 3.5m at the seaward entrance of the distributary channels, reaching a peak of about 5m at the delta apex.   Seismic profiles and radiometrically dated core samples indicate that the delta is prograding seawards at an average rate of about 6 m/a   
The Fly Delta is considered as a global "type case" of a tide-dominated delta and the patterns of sedimentation seen in the Delta today have been studied by sedimentary geologists as a model for interpreting the ancient rock record 

The river delta is studded with low and swampy islands covered with mangrove and nipa palm, with villages and cultivated areas on these islands. The land on both sides of the estuary is of the same character. The islands in the estuary are flat and covered with 
thick, fertile alluvial soil. The largest islands are Kiwai Island, Purutu Island, Wabuda Island, Aibinio Island, Mibu Island, and Domori Island. Kiwai, Wabuda and Domori are inhabited.

A list of the river delta islands is:

The inhabitants of the Fly River delta engage in agriculture and hunting. Coconut palm, breadfruit, plantain, sago palm, and sugar cane are grown.

Fly River turtle 
The Fly River turtle, also known as the Pig-nosed turtle due to its odd nose, is notably different from other turtles due to its piglike nose. The only freshwater turtle to have flippers, the turtle is known to rarely leave water, except in dire circumstances. They are also known to be omnivores who rarely consume meat.

History 
The Fly was first discovered by Europeans in 1845 when Francis Blackwood, commanding the corvette HMS Fly, surveyed the western coast of the Gulf of Papua. The river was named after his ship and he proclaimed that it would be possible for a small steam-powered boat to travel up the mighty river.

In 1876, Italian explorer, Luigi D'Albertis, was the first person to successfully attempt this when he travelled 900 km into the interior of New Guinea, in his steamer, Neva.  It was the furthest any European explorer had ever been into the island.

Environmental issues
Both the Strickland and the Ok Tedi Rivers have been the source of environmental controversy due to tailings waste from the Porgera Mine and the Ok Tedi Mine, respectively. Sediment sampling and coring in the distributary channels of the Fly Delta had not detected copper concentrations significantly higher than background as of 1994. In 2008, Ian Campbell, a former advisor to Ok Tedi Mining Limited, claimed that company data suggest significant portions of the Fly River floodplain are at a high risk from acid mine drainage.

See also

Ok Tedi environmental disaster

References 

 
Rivers of Papua New Guinea
Gulf of Papua
International rivers of Asia
International rivers of Oceania
Indonesia–Papua New Guinea border
Western Province (Papua New Guinea)
Rivers of Papua (province)
Rivers of Indonesia